Abujh Mon ('Inconsolable Mind') is a 1972 Bangladeshi film by Kazi Zahir, starring Shabana and Razzak in the lead roles. It was one of the most prominent commercial Bangladeshi films produced in the immediate aftermath of the Bangladesh Liberation War. It was one of seven films selected for the 1973 Bangladesh Film Festival in India.

Story
A Hindu girl, Madhabi Banerjee, and a young Muslim physician, Masum, fall in love with each other. But her father, an influential person in the village opposes their inter-community relationships. In the long run, their love defeats the boundaries of religions.

Cast 
Shabana - Madhabi Banerjee
Sujata - Rabeya
Abdur Razzak - Masum
Khan Joynul

Soundtrack

Altaf Mahmud composed the music and Gazi Mazharul Anwar penned the songs. The song "Shudhu Gaan Geye Porichoy" sung by Sabina Yasmin became a huge hit. It was her first breakthrough.

"Shudhu Gaan Geye Porichoy (female)" - Sabina Yasmin
"Shudhu Gaan Geye Porichoy (male)" - Abdul Jabbar
"E Ki Shonale Amay" - Sabina Yasmin

References

1972 films
Bengali-language Bangladeshi films
Films scored by Altaf Mahmud
1970s Bengali-language films